The 2013 CIS Men's University Cup Hockey Tournament (51st Annual) was held March 14–17, 2013. It was the first of two consecutive CIS Championships to be held at the Credit Union Centre in Saskatoon hosted by the University of Saskatchewan. The defending champions were the McGill Redmen, but they were unable to defend their title, having been eliminated in the first round of the OUA-East playoffs by the Nipissing Lakers.

The best team in each Pool advanced to the final. All pool games must be decided by a win, there were no ties. If a pool has a three-way tie for 1st (all teams have 1-1 records) than GF/GA differential among the tied teams is the first tie-breaker.

Road to the Cup

AUS playoffs
The AUS playoffs were held from  February 13 to March 7, 2013.

OUA playoffs
The OUA playoffs were held from February 13 to March 9, 2013.

Note 1: The Queen's Cup championship game must be held in Ontario (part of the arrangement when the RSEQ hockey league merged with the OUA). When a Quebec based OUA-East representative is the higher seed and should 'host' the game - the game shall be hosted by the OUA-West team instead, but the OUA-East team shall be the 'home' team and have last change.

Note 2: Since the University Cup wild-card spot was allocated to the AUS Conference, the OUA did not hold a 3rd Place/Bronze medal game.

Canada West playoffs
The Canada West playoffs were as follows:

University Cup
The six teams to advance to the tournament are listed below. The wild-card team was selected from the AUS Conference as the OUA was provided the wild-card in 2012 and CW teams are ineligible as they are the host conference.

Pool A - Afternoon

 St. Mary's Huskies advance to the Gold Medal final based on the first tie-breaker of having the best GF/GA Differential of +3.

Note: Saint Mary's becomes the 4th team to advance to the Championship Final with a 1-1 record (Alberta-2008, Western-2009 and McGill-2011).

Pool B - Evening

Championship final
Bench assignments for the championship finals were based on each advancing team's 2 pool games, not their tournament seed. UNB was determined to be the home team with a record of 2-0 versus Saint Mary's with a record of 1-1.

Fewest Goals
The 2 goal aggregate in the Championship final represented the lowest ever to date - one lower than the previous record of 3 (1990, 2-1 and 2003 3-0). The shutout was the fourth shutout in a Championship final (1972, 2003, 2011 & 2013) and the first time a team has accomplished it twice (UNB's 4th Championship title in 2011 was a 4-0 shutout of McGill).

Tournament All-Stars
Tyler Carroll, from the UNB Varsity Reds, was selected as the Major W.J. 'Danny' McLeod Award for CIS University Cup MVP. Carroll led all players in goals (4) and was second in points with 4.

Joining Carroll on the tournament all-star team were:
Forward: Nick MacNeil (UNB Varsity Reds)
Forward: Cory Tanaka (Saint Mary's Huskies)
Defenseman: Jesse Craige (Alberta Golden Bears)
Defenseman: Marc-Antoine Desnoyers (UNB Varsity Reds)
Goalie: Dan LaCosta (UNB Varsity Reds)

References

External links
 Tournament Website

U Sports ice hockey
Ice hockey competitions in Saskatchewan
University Cup, 2013
Sports competitions in Saskatoon